George Baxter Upham (December 27, 1768 – February 10, 1848) was an American politician and a United States Representative from the U. S. state of New Hampshire.

Early life
Born in Brookfield in the Province of Massachusetts Bay, Upham attended the common schools and Phillips Exeter Academy in Exeter, New Hampshire.  He graduated from Harvard University in 1789, studied law and was admitted to the bar in 1792.

Career
Upham practiced law in Claremont, New Hampshire, and served as solicitor for Cheshire County from December 15, 1796, to 1804.

Elected as a Federalist to the Seventh United States Congress and served as United States Representative for the state of New Hampshire from March 4, 1801, to March 3, 1803.  He declined to be a candidate for reelection in 1802.

Upham was a member of the New Hampshire House of Representatives from 1804 to 1813 and again in 1815.  He served as Speaker of the House in 1809 and 1815.  He served in the State Senate in 1814. He resumed the practice of law and was president of Claremont Bank for twenty years  after retiring from public life.

He was elected a member of the American Antiquarian Society in 1815.

Death
Upham died in Claremont, Sullivan County, New Hampshire, on February 10, 1848 (age 79 years, 45 days). He is interred at Pleasant Street Cemetery, Claremont, New Hampshire.

Family life
Upham was the son of Phineas and Susanna Buckminster Upham, brother of Jabez Upham, and cousin of Charles Wentworth Upham. He married Mary Duncan on December 31, 1805, and they had six children: George Baxter, Robert Harris, Jabez Baxter, Harriet Harris, James Phineas, and Edward B.

References

External links

1768 births
1848 deaths
Members of the New Hampshire House of Representatives
New Hampshire state senators
People from Brookfield, Massachusetts
Phillips Exeter Academy alumni
Harvard University alumni
Speakers of the New Hampshire House of Representatives
Federalist Party members of the United States House of Representatives from New Hampshire
Members of the American Antiquarian Society